Heinsch is a surname. Notable persons with that surname include:

 Johann Georg Heinsch (1647–1712), Czech-German artist
 Jürgen Heinsch (1940–2022), German football player and trainer